In enzymology, a lysine-tRNAPyl ligase is an enzyme that catalyzes the chemical reaction

ATP + L-lysine + tRNAPyl  AMP + diphosphate + L-lysyl-tRNAPyl

The 3 substrates of this enzyme are ATP, L-lysine, and tRNA(Pyl), whereas its 3 products are AMP, diphosphate, and L-lysyl-tRNA(Pyl).

This enzyme belongs to the family of ligases, to be specific those forming carbon-oxygen bonds in aminoacyl-tRNA and related compounds.  The systematic name of this enzyme class is L-lysine:tRNAPyl ligase (AMP-forming).

References

 
 

EC 6.1.1
Enzymes of unknown structure